The 1913 South Dakota Coyotes football team represented the University of South Dakota as an independent during the 1913 college football season. Led by third-year head coach James Henderson, the Coyotes compiled a record of 3–3.

Schedule

References

South Dakota
South Dakota Coyotes football seasons
South Dakota Coyotes football